Frederick Holman (9 February 1883 – 23 January 1913) was an English competitive swimmer from Dawlish, Devon, England.  Holman represented Great Britain at the 1908 Summer Olympics in London, where he won the gold medal in the men's 200-metre breaststroke event and did not compete in any other events.

He died of typhoid fever in Exeter in January 1913 aged 29. He was married but had no children. Holman is an "Honor Swimmer" member of the International Swimming Hall of Fame.

See also
 List of members of the International Swimming Hall of Fame
 List of Olympic medalists in swimming (men)
 World record progression 200 metres breaststroke

References

External links
Frederick Holman (GBR) – Honor Swimmer profile at International Swimming Hall of Fame 

1883 births
1913 deaths
Male breaststroke swimmers
English male swimmers
Olympic swimmers of Great Britain
Swimmers at the 1908 Summer Olympics
English Olympic medallists
Olympic gold medallists for Great Britain
World record setters in swimming
Medalists at the 1908 Summer Olympics
Olympic gold medalists in swimming
Deaths from typhoid fever